bunkered is a Scottish golf magazine published by DC Thomson. Based in Dundee, Scotland, the magazine was launched in 1996 and is published eight times per year. It covers the entire spectrum of golf, with a particular emphasis on Scottish golf. It is the most widely read and sold golf publication in Scotland.

History

The first official edition of bunkered was launched in April 1996 and was the first of four issues that year. In 1998, production was increased to five editions per year and, in 1999, was upped to six editions. Since 2002, the magazine has been published eight times per year. The magazine celebrated the publication of its 100th edition in 2010 at the Open Championship in St Andrews.

In 1999, bunkered became the biggest-selling golf magazine in Scotland, a position it has continued to strengthen. The magazine is renowned for its blend of content, including big-name interviews, in-depth features, top instruction tips, informed columnists and opinions, golf course reviews and information, golf holiday destinations and travel advice, and the latest up-to-the-minute golf equipment.

The magazine has interviewed many famous golfers such as Jack Nicklaus, Arnold Palmer, Tom Watson, Gary Player, Seve Ballesteros, Colin Montgomerie, Donald Trump, and many more. 

bunkered has also been behind many exciting initiatives and events, such as the bunkered Matchplay Challenge held in 2004 and 2007. A Ryder Cup-style match, it saw teams representing the Scottish amateur and professional circuits do battle with one another.

The ongoing success of bunkered has enabled PSP Publishing to branch out and diversify its products. It included the launch of the annual Scottish Golf Show in 2006.

Green Fee Savers
In 1999, bunkered launched Green Fee Savers, a discount golf program that enabled recreational golfers to enjoy half-price rounds at hundreds of clubs across the UK and Ireland. It was discontinued in 2010.

Notable columnists 
 Arthur Montford - 1996–present
 Paul Lawrie - 2001–2005
 Colin Montgomerie - 2008–2010
 Bernard Gallacher - 1998–2008
 Dougie Donnelly - 2016–2018

Awards 
bunkered and its personnel have won a number of PPA Awards.

 Scottish Publisher of the Year, 2011
 Consumer Magazine Editor of the Year, 2010
 Consumer Magazine Editor of the Year, 2008
 Scottish Brand Development of the Year, 2009
 Scottish Publisher of the Year, 2006
 Scottish Consumer Magazine of the Year, 2004

References

External links

1996 establishments in Scotland
Eight times annually magazines published in the United Kingdom
Golf in the United Kingdom
Golf magazines
Magazines established in 1996
Sports magazines published in Scotland
Mass media in Glasgow